China's banking sector had  in assets at the end of 2020. The "big four/five" state-owned commercial banks are the Bank of China, the China Construction Bank, the Industrial and Commercial Bank of China, and the Agricultural Bank of China, all of which are among the largest banks in the world . The Bank of Communications is sometimes included. Other notable big and also the largest banks in the world are China Merchants Bank and Ping An Bank.

History 

Chinese financial institutions conducted all major banking functions, including the acceptance of deposits, the making of loans, issuing notes, money exchange, and long-distance remittance of money by the Song Dynasty (960-1279). In 1024, the first paper currency was issued by the state in Sichuan.

Due to structural weaknesses of traditional Chinese law, Chinese financial institutions focused primarily on commercial banking based on close familial and personal relationships, and their working capital was primarily based on the float from short-term money transfers rather than long-term demand deposits. The modern concepts of consumer banking and fractional reserve banking never developed among traditional Chinese banks and were introduced to China by European bankers in the 19th century.

Piaohao
An early Chinese banking institution was called the piaohao, also known as Shanxi banks because they were owned primarily by natives of Shanxi. The first piaohao originated from the Xiyuecheng Dye Company of Pingyao.[2] To deal with the transfer of large amounts of cash from one branch to another, the company introduced drafts, cashable in the company's many branches around China. Although this new method was originally designed for business transactions within the Xiyuecheng Company, it became so popular that in 1823 the owner gave up the dye business altogether and reorganised the company as a special remittance firm, Rishengchang Piaohao. In the next thirty years, eleven piaohao were established in Shanxi province, in the counties of Qixian, Taigu, and Pingyao. By the end of the nineteenth century, thirty-two piaohao with 475 branches were in business covering most of China.[3]

All piaohao were organized as single proprietaries or partnerships, where the owners carried unlimited liability. They concentrated on interprovincial remittances, and later on conducting government services. From the time of the Taiping Rebellion, when transportation routes between the capital and the provinces were cut off, piaohao began involved with the delivery of government tax revenue. Piaohao grew by taking on a role in advancing funds and arranging foreign loans for provincial governments, issuing notes, and running regional treasuries.[4]

Qianzhuang
Independent of the nationwide network of piaohao there were a large number of small native banks, generally called qianzhuang. These institutions first appeared in the Yangzi Delta region, in Shanghai, Ningpo, and Shaoxing. The first qianzhuang can be traced to at least the mid-eighteenth century. In 1776, several of these Shanghainese banks organized themselves into a guild under the name of qianye gongsuo.[5] In contrast to piaohao, most qianzhuang were local and functioned as commercial banks by conducting local money exchange, issuing cash notes, exchanging bills and notes, and discounting for the local business community.

Qianzhuang maintained close relationships with Chinese merchants, and grew with the expansion of China's foreign trade. When Western banks first entered China, they issued "chop loans" (caipiao) to the qianzhuang, who would then lend this money to Chinese merchants who used it to purchase goods from foreign firms. Qianzhuang also provided loans to foreign banks. It is estimated that there were around 10,000 qianzhuang in China in the early 1890s.[6]

Entry of foreign banks
British and other European banks entered China around the middle of the nineteenth century to service the growing number of Western trade firms. The Chinese coined the term yinhang (銀行), meaning "silver institution", for the English word "bank". The first foreign bank in China was the Bombay-based British Oriental Bank (東藩匯理銀行), which opened branches in Hong Kong, Guangzhou and Shanghai in the 1840s. Other British banks followed suit and set up their branches in China one after another. The British enjoyed a virtual monopoly on modern banking for forty years. The Hong Kong and Shanghai Banking Corporation (香港上海匯豐銀行), now HSBC, established in 1865 in Hong Kong, later became the largest foreign bank in China.

In the early 1890s, Germany's Deutsch-Asiatische Bank (德華銀行), Japan's Yokohama Specie Bank (橫濱正金銀行), France's Banque de l'Indochine (東方匯理銀行), and Russia's Russo-Asiatic Bank (華俄道勝銀行) opened branches in China and challenged British ascendancy in China's financial market. By the end of the nineteenth century there were nine foreign banks with forty-five branches in China's treaty ports.[7]

At the time due to unfair treaties, foreign banks enjoyed extraterritorial rights. They also enjoyed complete control over China's international remittance and foreign trade financing. Being unregulated by the Chinese government, they were free to issue banknotes for circulation, accept deposits from Chinese citizens, and make loans to the qianzhuang.

Government banks
After the launch of the Self-strengthening movement, the Qing government began initiating large industrial projects which required large amounts of capital. Though the existing domestic financial institutions provided sufficient credit and transfer facilities to support domestic trade and worked well with small-scale enterprises, they could not meet China's new financial demands. China turned to foreign banks for large scale and long term finance. Following a series of military defeats, the Qing government was forced to borrow from foreign banks and syndicates to finance its indemnity payments to foreign powers.

A number of proposals were made by a modern Chinese banking institution from the 1860s onwards. Li Hongzhang, one of the leaders of the self-strengthening movement, made serious efforts to create a foreign-Chinese joint bank in 1885, and again in 1887.

The Imperial Bank of China (中國通商銀行), China's first modern bank, opened for business in 1897. The bank was organized as a joint-stock firm. It adopted the internal regulations of HSBC, and its senior managers were foreign professionals. After the proclamation of the Republic of China, the bank changed its English name to the Commercial Bank of China in 1912. The name more accurately translated its Chinese name and removed any link to the Qing Dynasty.

In 1905, China's first central bank was established as the Bank of the Board of Revenue(大淸戶部銀行). Three years later, its name was changed to the Great Qing Government Bank (大淸銀行). Intended as a replacement for all existing banknotes, the Da Qing Bank's note was granted exclusive privilege to be used in all public and private fund transfers, including tax payments and debt settlements. Da Qing Bank was also given exclusive privilege to run the state treasury. The Board of Revenue that controlled most of the central government's revenue transferred most of its tax remittance through the bank and its branches. The government entrusted the bank with the transfer of the Salt Surplus Tax, diplomatic expenditures, the management of foreign loans, the payment of foreign indemnities, and the deposit and transfer of the customs tax in many treaty ports.

Following the Xinhai Revolution of 1911, Daqing Bank was renamed the Bank of China. This bank continues to exist today.

Another government bank, the Bank of Communications (交通銀行), was organized in 1908 by the Ministry of Posts and Communications to raise money for the redemption of the Beijing-Hankou Railway from Belgian contractors. The bank's aim was to unify funding for steamship lines, railways, as well as telegraph and postal facilities.

Private banks
The first private bank dates to 1897, courtesy of the entrepreneurship of Shen Xuanhui.[8] Three private banks appeared in the late Qing period, all created by private entrepreneurs without state funding. The Xincheng Bank was established in Shanghai in 1906, followed by the National Commercial Bank in Hangzhou the following year, and the Ningpo Commercial and Savings Bank (四明銀行) in 1908. In that year, the Regulations of Banking Registration was issued by the Ministry of Revenue, which continued to have effect well after the fall of the Qing dynasty.

A lion's share of the profitable official remittance business was taken by the Daqing Bank from the piaohao. The piaohao all but disappeared following the Xinhai Revolution in 1911.

The same period saw the increasing power of private interests in modern Chinese banking and the concentration of banking capital. In Shanghai, the so-called "southern three banks" (南三行) were established. They were the Shanghai Commercial and Savings Bank (上海商業儲蓄銀行), the National Commercial Bank (浙江興業銀行), and the Zhejiang Industrial Bank (浙江實業銀行). Four other banks, known as the "northern four banks" (北四行) emerged later. They were the Yien Yieh Commercial Bank (鹽業銀行), the Kincheng Banking Corporation (金城銀行), the Continental Bank (大陸銀行), and the China & South Sea Bank (中南銀行). The first three were initiated by current and retired officials of the Beijing government, whilst the last was created by an overseas Chinese.

Note suspension incident
In 1916 the Republican government in Beijing ordered the suspension of paper note conversion to silver. With the backing of the Mixed Court, the Shanghai Branch of the Bank of China successfully resisted the order.

The Bank of China's bylaws were revised in 1917 to restrict government intervention.[9]

Golden Age of Chinese banking
The decade from the Northern Expedition to the Second Sino-Japanese War in 1937 has been described as a "golden decade" for China's modernization, as well as for its banking industry.[10] Modern Chinese banks extended their business in scope, making syndicated industrial loans and offering loans to rural areas.

The Nationalist government created the Central Bank of China in 1928, with T.V. Soong as its first president. The Bank of China was reorganized as a bank specializing in the management of foreign exchange while the Bank of Communications focused on developing industry.

The Bureau of Financial Supervision was set up under the Ministry of Finance to supervise financial affairs.

Confronted with imminent war with Japan, the Chinese government took control of over 70 percent of the assets of modern Chinese banks through the notorious banking coup.

After 1949

The history of the Chinese banking system has been somewhat checkered. Nationalization and consolidation of the country's banks received the highest priority in the earliest years of the People's Republic, and banking was the first sector to be completely socialized. In the period of recovery after the Chinese civil war (1949–52), the People's Bank of China moved very effectively to halt raging inflation and bring the nation's finances under central control. Over the course of time, the banking organization was modified repeatedly to suit changing conditions and new policies.

The banking system was centralized early on under the Ministry of Finance, which exercised firm control over all financial services, credit, and the money supply. During the 1980s the banking system was expanded and diversified to meet the needs of the reform program, and the scale of banking activity rose sharply. New budgetary procedures required state enterprises to remit to the state only a tax on income and to seek investment funds in the form of bank loans. Between 1979 and 1985, the volume of deposits nearly tripled and the value of bank loans rose by 260 percent. By 1987 the banking system included the People's Bank of China, Agricultural Bank of China, Bank of China (which handled foreign exchange matters), China Investment Bank, China Industrial and Commercial Bank, People's Construction Bank, Communications Bank, People's Insurance Company of China, rural credit cooperatives, and urban credit cooperatives.

The People's Bank of China was the central bank and the foundation of the banking system. Although the bank overlapped in function with the Ministry of Finance and lost many of its responsibilities during the Cultural Revolution, in the 1970s it was restored to its leading position. As the central bank, the People's Bank of China had sole responsibility for issuing currency and controlling the money supply. It also served as the government treasury, the main source of credit for economic units, the clearing center for financial transactions, the holder of enterprise deposits, the national savings bank, and a ubiquitous monitor of economic activities.

Another financial institution, the Bank of China, handled all dealings in foreign exchange. It was responsible for allocating the country's foreign exchange reserves, arranging foreign loans, setting exchange rates for China's currency, issuing letters of credit, and generally carrying out all financial transactions with foreign firms and individuals. The Bank of China had offices in Beijing and other cities engaged in foreign trade and maintained overseas offices in major international financial centers, including Hong Kong, London, New York City, Singapore, and Luxemburg.

The Agricultural Bank was created in the 1950s to facilitate financial operations in the rural areas. The Agricultural Bank provided financial support to agricultural units. It issued loans, handled state appropriations for agriculture, directed the operations of the rural credit cooperatives, and carried out overall supervision of rural financial affairs. The Agricultural Bank was headquartered in Beijing and had a network of branches throughout the country. It flourished in the late 1950s and mid-1960s but languished thereafter until the late 1970s, when the functions and autonomy of the Agricultural Bank were increased substantially to help promote higher agricultural production. In the 1980s it was restructured again and given greater authority in order to support the growth and diversification of agriculture under the responsibility system.

The People's Construction Bank managed state appropriations and loans for capital construction. It checked the activities of loan recipients to ensure that the funds were used for their designated construction purpose. Money was disbursed in stages as a project progressed. The reform policy shifted the main source of investment funding from the government budget to bank loans and increased the responsibility and activities of the People's Construction Bank.

Rural credit cooperatives were small, collectively owned savings and lending organizations that were the main source of small-scale financial services at the local level in the countryside. They handled deposits and short-term loans for individual farm families, villages, and cooperative organizations. Subject to the direction of the Agricultural Bank, they followed uniform state banking policies but acted as independent units for accounting purposes. In 1985 rural credit cooperatives held total deposits of ¥72.5 billion.

Urban credit cooperatives were a relatively new addition to the banking system in the mid-1980s, when they first began widespread operations. As commercial opportunities grew in the reform period, the thousands of individual and collective enterprises that sprang up in urban areas created a need for small-scale financial services that the formal banks were not prepared to meet. Bank officials therefore encouraged the expansion of urban credit cooperatives as a valuable addition to the banking system. In 1986 there were more than 1,100 urban credit cooperatives, which held a total of ¥3.7 billion in deposits and made loans worth ¥1.9 billion.

In the mid-1980s the banking system still lacked some of the services and characteristics that were considered basic in most countries. Interbank relations were very limited, and interbank borrowing and lending was virtually unknown. Checking accounts were used by very few individuals, and bank credit cards did not exist. In 1986 initial steps were taken in some of these areas. Interbank borrowing and lending networks were created among twenty-seven cities along the Yangtze River and among fourteen cities in north China. Interregional financial networks were created to link banks in eleven leading cities all over China, including Shenyang, Guangzhou, Wuhan, Chongqing, and Xi'an and also to link the branches of the Agricultural Bank. The first Chinese credit card, the Great Wall Card, was introduced in June 1986 to be used for foreign exchange transactions. Another financial innovation in 1986 was the opening of China's first stock exchanges since 1949. Small stock exchanges began operations somewhat tentatively in Shenyang, Liaoning Province, in August 1986 and in Shanghai in September 1986.

Throughout the history of the People's Republic, the banking system has exerted close control over financial transactions and the money supply. All government departments, publicly and collectively owned economic units, and social, political, military, and educational organizations were required to hold their financial balances as bank deposits. They were also instructed to keep on hand only enough cash to meet daily expenses; all major financial transactions were to be conducted through banks. Payment for goods and services exchanged by economic units was accomplished by debiting the account of the purchasing unit and crediting that of the selling unit by the appropriate amount. This practice effectively helped to minimize the need for currency.

Since 1949 China's leaders have urged the Chinese people to build up personal savings accounts to reduce the demand for consumer goods and increase the amount of capital available for investment. Small branch offices of savings banks were conveniently located throughout the urban areas. In the countryside savings were deposited with the rural credit cooperatives, which could be found in most towns and villages. In 1986 savings deposits for the entire country totaled over ¥223.7 billion.

In 2020, the 2020 Work Plan made it so Hong Kong residents, under a pilot program, would be able to open personal bank accounts in the Guangdong province. The accounts can be opened without leaving Hong Kong.

Supervisory bodies 
The People's Bank of China (PBOC) is China's central bank, which formulates and implements monetary policy. The PBOC maintains the banking sector's payment, clearing and settlement systems, and manages official foreign exchange and gold reserves. It oversees the State Administration of Foreign Exchange (SAFE) for setting foreign-exchange policies.

According to the 1995 Central Bank law, PBOC has full autonomy in applying the monetary instruments, including setting interest rate for commercial banks and trading in government bonds. The State Council maintains oversight of PBOC policies.

China Banking Regulatory Commission (CBRC) was officially launched on April 28, 2003, to take over the supervisory role of the PBOC. The goal of the landmark reform is to improve the efficiency of bank supervision and to help the PBOC to further focus on the macroeconomy and monetary policy.

According to the official Announcement by CBRC posted on its website, the CBRC is responsible for "the regulation and supervision of banks, asset management companies, trust and investment companies as well as other deposit-taking financial institutions. Its mission is to maintain a safe and sound banking system in China."

Domestic key players

The Big Four and others
In 1995, the Chinese Government introduced the Commercial Bank Law to commercialize the operations of the four state-owned banks, the Bank of China (BOC), the China Construction Bank (CCB), the Agricultural Bank of China (ABC), and the Industrial and Commercial Bank of China (ICBC).

The Industrial & Commercial Bank of China (ICBC) is the largest bank in China by total assets, total employees and total customers. ICBC differentiates itself from the other State Owned Commercial Banks by being second in foreign exchange business and 1st in RMB clearing business. It used to be the major supplier of funds to China's urban areas and manufacturing sector.

The Bank of China (BOC) specializes in foreign-exchange transactions and trade finance. In 2002, BOC Hong Kong (Holdings) was successfully listed on the Hong Kong Stock Exchange. The USD2.8 billion offering was over-subscribed by 7.5 times. The deal was a significant move in the reform of China's banking industry.

The China Construction Bank (CCB) specializes in medium to long-term credit for long term specialized projects, such as infrastructure projects and urban housing development.

The Agriculture Bank of China (ABC) specializes in providing financing to China's agricultural sector and offers wholesale and retail banking services to farmers, township and village enterprises (TVEs) and other rural institutions.

China Merchants Bank specializes in providing Personal Banking Business and Corporate & Investment Banking Business.

Ping An Bank specializes in providing services in retail and corporate banking, including investment banking services.

Policy banks
Three new "policy" banks, the Agricultural Development Bank of China (ADBC), China Development Bank (CDB), and the Export-Import Bank of China (Chexim), were established in 1994 to take over the government-directed spending functions of the four state-owned commercial banks. These banks are responsible for financing economic and trade development and state-invested projects.

ADBC provides funds for agricultural development projects in rural areas; the CDB specializes in infrastructure financing, and Chexim specializes in trade financing.

Foreign sponsored state banks 
Due to massive debt problems facing the Chinese economy, the People's Bank of China (PBC) introduced the Foreign Country Sponsored State Banks in late 2016. This type of financial institution is formed when a bank from a different country is allowed to set up retail commercial operations in a joint venture with the PBC.  The idea is that foreign players with a large appetite for risk will be incentivized to start operations in China, and the PBC will retain supervision of the bank and possibly remove leverage from the Chinese banking system. Central banks from Egypt and Switzerland are the first banks to be approved for operations, and they will begin those operations as soon as February 2017.

City commercial banks
The third significant group in Chinese banking market is the city commercial banks. Many of them were founded on the basis of urban credit cooperatives. The first one was Shenzhen City Commercial Bank in 1995. In 1998, PBOC announced that all urban cooperative banks change their name to city commercial bank. And there are 69 city commercial banks set up from 1995 to 1998. In 2005 there were 112 city commercial banks in all of China. This number has increased through additional transformations to 140 in 2009.  Most city commercial banks have strong ties to their local government and are majority or wholly state owned. Since 2005 some city commercial banks diversify their shareholders, inviting Chinese and international private companies to take minority shares, merging and cross-shareholding. Some of the banks have listed their shares. While the market for city commercial banks is oriented towards supporting the regional economy, it also finances local infrastructure and other government projects. Since 2008, a strong trend has emerged for city commercial banks to extend business beyond their home region. They are also often the main shareholder behind village and township banks (VTB). Some have founded so-called small loans units to serve smaller business clients better. Taizhou City Commercial Bank, Bank of Beijing, Bank of Tianjin and Bank of Ningbo are examples for city commercial banks.

Trust and investment corporations
In the midst of the reforms of the 1990s, the government established some new investment banks that engaged in various forms of merchant and investment banking activities. However, many of the 240 or so international trust and investment corporations (ITICs) established by government agencies and provincial authorities experienced severe liquidity problems after the bankruptcy of the Guangdong International Trust and Investment Corporation (GITIC) in late 1998. The largest surviving ITIC is China International Trust and Investment Corporation (CITIC), which has a banking subsidiary known as China CITIC Bank.

County banks
A County Bank is a kind of financial institution with the purpose of boosting rural economic development, which has developed in China since 2005.

Reforms in the banking industry 
Years of government-directed lending has presented Chinese banks with large amounts of non-performing loans. According to the Central Bank's report, non-performing loans account for 21.4% to 26.1% of total lending of China's four big banks in 2002. In 1999, four asset management companies (AMC) were established to transfer the non-performing assets from the banks. The AMCs plan to repackage the non-performing loans into viable assets and sell them off to the investors.

PBOC has encouraged banks to diversify their portfolios by increasing their services to the private sector and individual consumers. In July 2000, a personal credit rating system was launched in Shanghai to be used to assess consumer credit risk and set ratings standards. This is an important move in developing China's consumer credit industry, and increase bank loans to individuals.

The central government has allowed several small banks to raise capital through bonds or stock issues. Followed the listing of Shenzhen Development Bank and Pudong Development Bank, China Minsheng Bank, then the only private bank in China, was listed on the Shanghai Stock Exchange (A-Share) in December 2000. More Chinese banks are expected to list in the next two years in order to raise capital.

The reform of the banking system has been accompanied by PBOC's decision to decontrol interest rates. Market-based interest rate reform is intended to establish the pricing mechanism of the deposit and lending rates based on market supply and demand. The central bank would continue to adjust and guide the interest rate development, which allows the market mechanism to play a dominant role in financial resource allocation.

The sequence of the reform is to liberalize the interest rate of foreign currency before that of domestic currency, lending before deposit, large amount and long term before small amount and short term. As a first step, the PBOC liberalized the interest rates for foreign currency loans and large deposits (US$3 million and over) in September 2000. Rate for deposits below US$3 million remain subject to PBOC control. In March 2002, the PBOC unified foreign currency interest rate policies for Chinese and foreign financial institutions in China. Small foreign exchange deposits of Chinese residents with foreign banks in China were included in the PBOC interest rate administration of small foreign exchange deposits, so that domestic and foreign financial institutions are treated fairly with regard to the interest rate policy of foreign exchange deposits.

As interest rate liberalization progressed, the PPOC liberalized, simplified, or abandoned 114 categories of interest rates initially under control since 1996. At present, 34 categories of interest rates remain subject to PBOC control. The full liberalization of interest rates on other deposit accounts, including checking and saving accounts, is expected to take much longer. On the lending side, market-determined interest rates on loans will first be introduced in rural areas and then followed by rate liberalization in cities.

Deposit insurance
According to a confidential informant privy to the agenda at the closed meeting, creating a system of deposit insurance was expected to be discussed at the annual Central Economic Work Conference in December, 2012; studying deposit insurance was included in the 5 year plan for 2011–2015. The government's practice, in the absence of formal provisions for deposit insurance or bank failure, has been to reimburse all depositors, large or small, at small banks and rural cooperatives which fail; this is done to avoid the social unrest which might accompany a bank run. Large banks which might have failed without government support have been propped up. Introduction of deposit insurance is part of a projected general reform of the banking system which would wean banks from their close relationship to state-owned enterprises; banks strongly prefer to lend to state-owned enterprises because payment is seen to be guaranteed. Loans to private firms and individuals are seen as risky; consequently, the private sector is starved for credit.

If deposit insurance premiums were based on volume of deposits China's Big Four banks, which would not be permitted to fail in any event, would pay hefty premiums, thus subsidizing smaller banks. If adopted, it is anticipated that drafting of regulations and introduction of a system of deposit insurance would take at least a year. In order to attract depositors some banks in China have introduced deposit accounts which use deposited funds to make riskier loans and offer higher interest. Introduction of a scheme of deposit insurance which guarantees only standard low-interest accounts might serve to clarify the situation, explicitly excluding such trust funds from deposit guarantees.

Credit and Debit cards
By the end of the first quarter of 2009, about 1,888,374,100 (1.89 billion) bank cards had been issued in China. Of these cards, 1,737,901,000 (1.74 billion)  or 92% were debit cards, while the rest (150,473,100, or 150.5 million) were credit cards. In 2010 China had over 2.4 billion bankcards in circulation growing approximately 16% from the end of 2009.  At the end of 2008, China had approximately 1.84 million POS machines and 167,500 ATMs. About 1.18 million merchants in China accept banking cards.

At the end of 2008, there were 196 issuers in China that issue China UnionPay-branded cards. These issuers include the ‘big four’ banks (Industrial and Commercial Bank of China, the Bank of China, China Construction Bank, and the Agricultural Bank of China), as well as fast-growing second tier banks and city commercial banks like China Merchants Bank and Ping An Bank, and even some foreign banks with local operations.

Most of China's state-owned commercial banks now issue dual-currency cards, allowing cardholders to purchase goods within China in RMB and overseas in US dollars (Visa/Mastercard/AmEx/JCB), euros (Visa/Mastercard), Australian dollars (MasterCard), or Japanese yen (JCB). However, only Bank of China provides yen and Australian dollar-denominated credit cards.

According to a 2003 research study by Visa, the average per-transaction purchase with a card was US$253. Consumers used their credit cards mainly to purchase houses, vehicles, and home appliances, as well as to pay utility bills.

One major issue is the lack of a national credit bureau to provide credit information for banks to evaluate individual loan applicants. In 2002, the Shanghai Information Office and the People's Bank of China Shanghai branch established the first personal credit data organization involving 15 commercial banks. The Chinese Government, aiming to promote a nationwide credit system, has also set up a credit system research group. At present, large cities, such as Beijing, Guangzhou, Shenzhen, Chongqing, and Chengdu, are calling for a reliable credit data system. The PBOC is currently evaluating the feasibility of establishing a nationwide credit bureau.

Other obstacles include lack of merchant acceptance and a weak infrastructure for card processing. At present, only 2% of merchants in China are equipped to handle card transactions, although in some major cities like Shanghai the percentage is over 30%. China UnionPay was established to set up a national processing network connecting merchants and banks. China UnionPay has set up bankcard network service centers in 18 cities in addition to a national bankcard information switch center.

Products and services in the credit card system that the Chinese government wants to develop are credit card-related hardware, including POS and ATMs, credit card-related software for banks and merchants; and Credit and risk management training programs.

Foreign banks 
China's entry into the WTO is expected to create opportunities for foreign banks. As a milestone move to honor its WTO commitments, China released the Rules for Implementing the Regulations Governing Foreign Financial Institutions in the People's Republic of China in January 2002. The rules provide detailed regulations for implementing the administration of the establishment, registration, scope of business, qualification, supervision, dissolution and liquidation of foreign financial institutions. They also stipulate that foreign bank branches conducting full aspects of foreign-currency business and full aspects of RMB business to all categories of clients are required to have operating capital of at least 600 million RMB (US$72.3 million), of which at least 400 million RMB (US$48.2 million) must be held in RMB and at least 200 million RMB (US$24.1 million) in freely convertible currency.

Client restriction on foreign currency business was lifted immediately after China's entry into the WTO on December 11, 2001. Since then, foreign financial institutions have been permitted to provide foreign currency services to Chinese enterprises and individuals, and have been permitted to provide local currency business to all Chinese clients by the end of 2006. In 2007 five non-mainland banks were allowed to issue bank cards in China, with Bank of East Asia also allowed to issue UnionPay credit cards in the mainland (United Overseas Bank and Sumitomo Mitsui Financial Group have only issued cards in their home countries; they are not yet allowed to issue cards within the mainland). In May 2009 Woori Bank became the first Korean bank allowed to issue UnionPay debit cards (it issues UnionPay credit cards in Korea only).

Furthermore, when China entered the WTO, geographic restrictions placed on RMB-denominated business was phased out in four major cities—Shanghai, Shenzhen, Tianjin and Dalian. Then, on December 1, 2002, foreign-funded banks were allowed to commence RMB-denominated business in Guangzhou, Zhuhai, Qingdao, Nanjing and Wuhan.

Electronic banking
In 1994, China started the "Golden Card Project," enabling cards issued by banks to be used all over the country through a network. The establishment of the China Association of Banks rapidly promoted the inter-bank card network and by the end of 2004, the inter-region-inter-bank network had reached 600 cities, including all prefecture-level cities and more than 300 economically developed county-level cities.

See also
History of banking in China
List of banks in China
China Securities Journal

References

https://www.rba.gov.au/publications/bulletin/2012/sep/pdf/bu-0912-7.pdf

External links
China Banking Association (official website)

 
Cooperatives in China